Hendrik Detmers (Sprundel/Groot-Zundert, 20 March 1761 – The Hague, 8 September 1825), was a Dutch general who played an important part in the Battle of Waterloo as a colonel, commanding a brigade.

Life
Detmers was a son of Johan Detmers and Justina Constantia Tollius. He married Maria Johanna Kolff on 13 February 1789. They had one daughter.

Career

Dutch Republic
He entered service in the Dutch States Army in 1770 (age 10) as a cadet in the Onderwater regiment. He was promoted to second lieutenant on 16 May 1782. He became a captain in 1788 and was promoted to major in 1794. He took part in the Flanders Campaign, where he was involved in the siege of Maubeuge (1793), the Siege of Landrecies (1794), the Battle of Fleurus (1794), the skirmish around Seneffe, which village he defended, and the siege of Geertruidenberg (1795), which he helped defend. After the overthrow of the Dutch Republic by the Batavian Republic in January, 1795 he resigned his commission.

Orangist in exile
Apparently an ardent Orangist he joined the "Osnabrück Assembly," a group of former soldiers around Prince Frederick of Orange-Nassau who wanted to stage a raid into the Batavian Republic in the summer of 1795. After this project came to nothing he travelled to England where he became involved in the preparations of the Anglo-Russian invasion of Holland of 1799, which he joined on the British side. After the expedition came to nothing he joined the King's Dutch Brigade, a legion in British service founded by, and under command of, the Hereditary Prince. This regiment was formed from former personnel of the Dutch States Army and deserters from the Batavian army on the Isle of Wight in October, 1799. In December 1800, the infantry were put aboard transports and shipped to Cove in Ireland (the artillery remained in Lymington). They joined various regiments that were posted to Ireland at this time in the expectation that the implementation of the Acts to unite the Kingdom of Ireland and Kingdom of Great Britain into the United Kingdom of Great Britain and Ireland with effect from 1 January 1801, could cause some social unrest.
The Brigade was later deployed in the Channel Islands and on the Isle of Wight against possible French landings.
It was dissolved in 1802 and Detmers was put on half-pay. It is not exactly known what he did between 1802 and 1813. He may have returned to the Netherlands.

Waterloo and after
In 1814 Detmers again entered Dutch service as a lieutenant-colonel. He was promoted to colonel the same year and put in command of the 1st Brigade of the 3rd Division (general Chassé commanding). As such he took part in the Waterloo Campaign

At the start of the Battle of Waterloo the Dutch Third Division was placed in reserve on the right wing of the Allied Army under general Lord Hill. When the French Imperial Guard undertook its famous assault on the Allied right wing toward the end of the day, and the British line was hard pressed, the Dutch Third Division was ordered forward at the initiative of general Chassé. The 4th Grenadiers of the French Middle Guard were severely attacked by the battery of horse-artillery of the Dutch division, under command of captain Krahmer de Bichin, but they kept advancing. The British line (1/3rd Foot) poured fire onto the Guard, and general Chassé ordered Detmers to charge the French column with his brigade. This was to be a bayonet charge, as Chassé had a predilection for this type of manoeuvre (that had earned him the nickname of "général baionette" from Napoleon). The Dutch troops advanced in a state of high excitement, cheering wildly and lifting their shakos on their bayonets, according to a British eye-witness (captain Edward Macready, 2/30th regiment of Foot). In combination with the fire of the British infantry (notably the Guards and 52nd Oxfordshire regiment), and as this happened at the same time the French suffered a number of other setbacks, the 4th Grenadiers broke; this retreat is considered the "tipping point" of the battle: 'Wellington' gave the sign for a general advance of the Allied army after which Napoleon's army started to collapse.

Some have speculated that because of this feat of arms Wellington referred to Detmers, when he mentioned "... general Vanhope, commanding a Brigade of Infantry of the King of the Netherlands" honorably in his Dispatch of 19 June 1815 to Earl Bathurst This may be possible as there was not a single "general Vanhope" in the entire Dutch army, let alone anyone by that name that warranted a mention in dispatches.

In any case, Detmers received  a Knight's Cross Third Class in the Military Order of William for his exploit in 1815. On 24 August 1816 he was promoted to major-general and appointed Provincial Commander of the province of South Holland in the Dutch Army. He still was in that post when he died in 1825.

Notes and references

External links
 Anonymous. Napoleon's Guard at Waterloo 1815
 Horse Artillery Officers of the Netherlands Serving from 1813 to 1815: Smissen, Jacques-Louis-Dominique, Baron van der 
 based on 
 Relation des événements qui se sont produits à la 3me division de l'armée royale néerlandaise durant les journées des 15, 16, 17, et 18 juin 1815, et jusque dans la matinée du 19, in:

1761 births
1825 deaths
People from Rucphen
Dutch military commanders of the Napoleonic Wars
Knights Third Class of the Military Order of William
People from Zundert
Military personnel from The Hague
18th-century Dutch military personnel